Uncial 0100 (in the Gregory-Aland numbering), ε 070 (Soden), is a Greek-Coptic diglot uncial manuscript of the New Testament. It is dated palaeographically to the 7th-century.

Description 

The codex contains a small part of the Gospel of John 20:26-27.30-31, on one parchment leaf. The text is written in two columns per page, 33 lines per page, in large uncial letters. 

Currently it is dated by the INTF to the 7th-century.

From the same manuscript originated another leaf now catalogued as Uncial 0195. It represents a part of lectionary 963 (ℓ 963), and should be classified among the lectionaries than the uncials. 

The codex currently is located at the Bibliothèque nationale de France (Copt. 129,10), at Paris.

Text 
The Greek text of this codex Kurt Aland did not place in any Category.

In John 20:31 it reads ζωην αιωνιον along with manuscripts א, C(*), D, L, Ψ, f13 it vgmss syrp, h copsa, copbo; majority reads ζωην;

See also 

 List of New Testament uncials
 Coptic versions of the Bible
 Textual criticism

References

Further reading 

 E. Amélineau, "Notice des manuscrits coptes de la Bibliothèque nationale renfermant des textes bilingues du Nouveau Testament. Notices et extraits des manuscrits de la Bibliothèque nationale et autres bibliothèques", tome XXXIV, 2e partie NEMBM 34/2 (Paris: 1985), pp. 372–373, 407.

Greek New Testament uncials
7th-century biblical manuscripts
Greek-Coptic diglot manuscripts of the New Testament
Bibliothèque nationale de France collections